Thomas Connelly may refer to:

Thomas M. Connelly (born 1952), American business executive
Thomas L. Connelly (1938–1991)
Thomas Jefferson Connelly, Australian storekeeper, solicitor and local politician
Tom Connelly (1897–1941), American baseball player

See also
Tom Conneely (born 1959), Irish hurler
Thomas Connolly (disambiguation)
Thomas Conolly (disambiguation)